Wenceslaus I (c. 907 – 28 September 935 or 929), Wenceslas I or Václav the Good was the Duke (kníže) of Bohemia from 921 until his death, probably in 935.  According to the legend, he was assassinated by his younger brother, Boleslaus the Cruel.

His martyrdom and the popularity of several biographies gave rise to a reputation for heroic virtue that resulted in his sainthood. He was posthumously declared to be a king and patron saint of the Czech state. He is the subject of the well-known "Good King Wenceslas", a carol for Saint Stephen's Day.

Biography
Wenceslaus was the son of Vratislaus I, Duke of Bohemia from the Přemyslid dynasty. His grandfather, Bořivoj I of Bohemia, was converted to Christianity by Cyril and Methodius. His mother, Drahomíra, was the daughter of a pagan tribal chief of the Havelli, but was baptized at the time of her marriage. His paternal grandmother, Ludmila of Bohemia, saw to it that he was educated in the Old Slavonic language and, at an early age, Wenceslaus was sent to the college at Budeč.

In 921, when Wenceslaus was about thirteen, his father died and his grandmother became regent. Jealous of the influence that Ludmila wielded over Wenceslaus, Drahomíra arranged to have her killed. Ludmila was at Tetín Castle near Beroun when assassins murdered her on 15 September 921. She is said to have been strangled by them with her veil. She was at first buried in the church of St. Michael at Tetín, but her remains were later removed, probably by Wenceslaus, to the church of St. George in Prague, which had been built by his father.

Drahomíra then assumed the role of regent and immediately initiated measures against Christians. When Wenceslaus was 18, those Christian nobles who remained rebelled against Drahomira. The uprising was successful, and Drahomira was sent into exile to Budeč.

Reign

With the support of the nobles, Wenceslaus took control of the government. He "...reined in the dependent dukes who had become restive under the regency and used Christianity to strengthen his state."

After the fall of Great Moravia, the rulers of the Bohemian Duchy had to deal both with continuous raids by the Magyars and the forces of the Saxon and East Frankish king Henry the Fowler, who had started several eastern campaigns into the adjacent lands of the Polabian Slavs, homeland of Wenceslaus's mother. To withstand Saxon overlordship, Wenceslaus's father Vratislaus had forged an alliance with the Bavarian duke Arnulf, a fierce opponent of King Henry at that time. The alliance became worthless, however, when Arnulf and Henry reconciled at Regensburg in 921.

Early in 929, the joint forces of Duke Arnulf of Bavaria and King Henry I the Fowler reached Prague in a sudden attack that forced Wenceslaus to resume the payment of a tribute first imposed by the East Frankish king Arnulf of Carinthia in 895. Henry had been forced to pay a huge tribute to the Magyars in 926 and needed the Bohemian tribute, which Wenceslaus probably refused to pay after the reconciliation between Arnulf and Henry. Another possible reason for the attack was the formation of the anti-Saxon alliance between Bohemia, the Polabian Slavs, and the Magyars.

Wenceslaus introduced German priests into his realm and favoured the Latin rite instead of the old Slavic, which had gone into disuse in many places for want of priests. He also founded a rotunda consecrated to St. Vitus at Prague Castle in Prague that was the basis of present-day St. Vitus Cathedral.

Assassination

In September 935, a group of nobles allied with Wenceslaus's younger brother Boleslav plotted to kill him. After Boleslav invited Wenceslaus to a celebration of the feast of Saints Cosmas and Damian in Stará Boleslav, three of Boleslav's companions (Tira, Česta, and Hněvsa) fell on the duke and stabbed him to death. As the duke fell, Boleslav ran him through with a lance.

According to Cosmas of Prague, in his Chronica Boëmorum of the early 12th century, one of Boleslav's sons was born on the day of Wenceslaus's death. Because of the ominous circumstance of his birth, the infant was named Strachkvas, which means "a dreadful feast".

There is also a tradition that Wenceslaus's loyal servant Podevin avenged his death by killing one of the chief conspirators, an act for which he was executed by Boleslav.

The assassination of Wenceslaus has been characterized as an important turning point in early Bohemian history, as the rule of Boleslav I saw him renounce the Franks, centralize power in Bohemia and expand the territory of the polity.

Veneration

Wenceslaus was considered a martyr and saint immediately after his death, when a cult of Wenceslaus grew up in Bohemia and in England. Within a few decades, four biographies of him were in circulation. These hagiographies had a powerful influence on the High Middle Ages concept of the rex justus (righteous king), a monarch whose power stems mainly from his great piety as well as his princely vigor.

Referring approvingly to these hagiographies, the chronicler Cosmas of Prague, writing in about the year 1119, states:

Several centuries later this legend was asserted as fact by Pope Pius II.

Although Wenceslaus was only a duke during his lifetime, Holy Roman Emperor Otto I posthumously "conferred on [Wenceslaus] the regal dignity and title", which is why he is referred to as "king" in legend and song.

The hymn "Svatý Václave" (Saint Wenceslaus) or "Saint Wenceslas Chorale" is one of the oldest known Czech songs. Traceable to the 12th century AD, it is still among the most popular religious songs in the Bohemian lands. In 1918, at the founding of the modern Czechoslovak state, the song was discussed as a possible choice for the national anthem. During the Nazi occupation, it was often played along with the Czech anthem.

Wenceslaus's feast day is celebrated on September 28. On this day, celebrations and a pilgrimage are held in the city of Stará Boleslav, whereas the translation of his relics, which took place in 938, is commemorated on 4 March. Since 2000, the September 28 feast day has been a public holiday in the Czech Republic, celebrated as Czech Statehood Day.

In legend

According to legend, one Count Radislas rose in rebellion and marched against King Wenceslaus. The latter sent a deputation with offers of peace, but Radislas viewed this as a sign of cowardice. The two armies were drawn up opposite each other in battle array, when Wenceslaus, to avoid shedding innocent blood, challenged Radislas to single combat. As Radislas advanced toward the king, he saw by Wenceslaus's side two angels, who cried: "Stand off!" Thunderstruck, Radislas repented his rebellion, threw himself from his horse at Wenceslaus's feet, and asked for pardon. Wenceslaus raised him and kindly received him again into favour.

A second enduring legend claims an army of knights sleeps under Blaník, a mountain in the Czech Republic. They will awake and, under the command of Wenceslaus, bring aid to the Czech people in their ultimate danger. There is a similar legend in Prague which says that when the Motherland is in danger or in its darkest times and close to ruin, the equestrian statue of King Wenceslaus in Wenceslaus Square will come to life, raise the army sleeping in Blaník, and upon crossing the Charles Bridge his horse will stumble and trip over a stone, revealing the legendary sword of Bruncvík. With this sword, King Wenceslaus will slay all the enemies of the Czechs, bringing peace and prosperity to the land.

Legacy

Wenceslaus is the subject of the popular Saint Stephen's Day (celebrated on December 26 in the West) carol "Good King Wenceslas". It was published by John Mason Neale in 1853, and may be a translation of a poem by Czech poet Václav Alois Svoboda.
The usual American English spelling of the duke's name, "Wenceslaus", is occasionally encountered in later textual variants of the carol, although it was not used by Neale in his version. Wenceslaus is not to be confused with King Wenceslaus I of Bohemia (Wenceslaus I Premyslid), who lived more than three centuries later.

An equestrian statue of Saint Wenceslaus and other patrons of Bohemia (St. Adalbert, St. Ludmila, St. Prokop and St. Agnes of Bohemia) are located on Wenceslaus Square in Prague. The statue is a popular meeting place in Prague. Demonstrations against the Communist regime were held there.

His helmet and armour are on display inside Prague Castle.

In popular culture
The lavish 1930 silent film St. Wenceslas was at the time the most expensive Czech film ever made.

Ogden Nash wrote a comic epic poem, "The Christmas that Almost Wasn't" (1957), in which a boy awakens Wenceslaus and his knights to save the kingdom of Lullapat from usurpers who have outlawed Christmas, with elements from the legend of Wenceslas.

The 1994 television film, Good King Wenceslas, is a highly fictional account of his early life. The film stars Jonathan Brandis in the title role, supported by Leo McKern, Stefanie Powers, and Joan Fontaine as Ludmila.

See also

Crown of Saint Wenceslas
Sword of Saint Wenceslas
Statues of Saints Norbert, Wenceslaus and Sigismund
Good King Wenceslas

Notes

References

External links

Patron Saints Index: St. Wenceslaus
Catholic Online: St. Wenceslaus
Good King Wenceslas - The Real Story

 
910s births
935 deaths
Year of birth uncertain
10th-century Bohemian people
10th-century Christian martyrs
10th-century Christian saints
10th-century rulers in Europe
10th-century murdered monarchs
Burials at St. Vitus Cathedral
Christian monarchs
Christian royal saints
Roman Catholic royal saints
Christmas characters
Czech folklore
Czech murder victims
Czech Roman Catholic saints
Dukes of Bohemia
Medieval child monarchs